New Glasgow is an unincorporated area located in Queens County in the central portion of Prince Edward Island, south-west of North Rustico. It is situated amongst beautiful rolling hills on the Hunter River. New Glasgow has several popular tourist destinations, including the famous New Glasgow Lobster Suppers, the renowned Glasgow Hills Golf course, the Prince Edward Island Preserve Company, The Mill Restaurant and the FarmHouse Inn

Climate

References

External links
Government of PEI profile

Communities in Queens County, Prince Edward Island